Anthony R. Lupo (born March 13, 1966) is a department chair and professor of atmospheric science at the University of Missouri. He became a member of the American Meteorological Society in 1987, Sigma Xi in 1992, the National Weather Association in 2000, is a former expert reviewer for the 2001 IPCC Third Assessment Report, and became a Fulbright Scholar in 2004. He is also a fellow of the Royal Meteorological Society and the editor-in-chief of the scientific journal National Weather Digest.

Education
Lupo received his Associate of Science degree in 1986 from Cayuga Community College, his Bachelor's in 1988 from State University of New York at Oswego, and his Master's and PhD from Purdue University in 1991 and 1995, respectively.

Research
Lupo's primary research interests include the formation and characteristics of blocking anticyclones. Some of these causes Lupo and his research program have been studying include rising global temperatures and  levels. Lupo has also conducted research on La Nina years and how they tend to be hotter than typical years, as occurred in the US Midwest in 1889 and 2012.

Views on global warming
Lupo disagrees with the scientific consensus of global warming, acknowledging that human activity contributes to global warming but putting more faith in the view that it is a natural phenomenon. Lupo's skepticism and receipt of funding ($750 per month) from the Heartland Institute have generated controversy. Lupo says the work Heartland pays him to do does not directly relate to causes of global warming, but rather "interpret[ing] them [scientific studies] in a form that somebody can understand and digest." He has also said that he is not violating any conflict-of-interest rules by receiving this money.

Weather predictions
Lupo regularly makes predictions regarding the weather in Missouri, based on historical patterns and statistics (unlike the weatherman's forecast covering only next week). For example, shortly before Christmas in 2012 he predicted that “There’s not much chance for a white Christmas this year.” In addition, in February 2013, he predicted that the summer of 2013 will not be as dry in Missouri as that of 2012, when the state, as well as much of the rest of the United States, suffered one of the most extreme droughts in its history.

References

American atmospheric scientists
University of Missouri faculty
State University of New York at Oswego alumni
Purdue University alumni
People from Auburn, New York
New York (state) Republicans
1966 births
Living people